Phytoecia erythaca is a species of beetle in the family Cerambycidae. It was described by Francis Polkinghorne Pascoe in 1858, originally under the genus Saperda.

References

Phytoecia
Beetles described in 1858